U.S. Route 52 (US 52) is a north–south United States highway that runs for  from the South Carolina state line, near McFarlan, to the Virginia state line, near Mount Airy.  It serves as a strategic highway through the central North Carolina Piedmont.  Because of its alignment in the state, US 52 does not follow the standard convention of an even U.S. route number going east–west.

Between the South Carolina border and Salisbury, the route is an at-grade road, varying in width from two to four lanes.  It connects the town centers of a number of small towns in Anson, Stanly, Cabarrus, and Rowan Counties.

Between Salisbury in Rowan County and Mount Airy in Surry County, US 52 is a limited access freeway, and is in the process of being upgraded to Interstate Highway standards.  Several Interstate highways either already, or are planned to in the near future, overlay the US 52 freeway. From Salisbury to Lexington, it is cosigned with I-85.  From Lexington to I-40 south of Winston-Salem it is cosigned with I-285.  In the future, as the freeway is upgraded, the I-285 designation will be extended north through Winston-Salem to meet a future interchange with the Winston-Salem Northern Beltway.  North of that point, I-74 will leave the beltway to join US 52 and the two will remain cosigned until reaching the current short segment of I-74 located south of Mount Airy.  

North of the I-74 junction in Surry County, the freeway continues on for a short distance, before becoming a four lane divided boulevard known as the Andy Griffith Parkway to bypass the town center of Mt. Airy.  Immediately before crossing into Virginia, the route reduces back down to two lanes.

Route description

US 52 enters North Carolina at Mount Airy. A bypass around Mount Airy, which carries US 52 is designated as the Andy Griffith Parkway. It goes by Pilot Mountain one of the most distinctive natural features in North Carolina. Through the Piedmont Triad region, US 52 is mostly a limited-access freeway. The route joins Interstate 85 Business into Lexington, North Carolina and shares Interstate 85 around Salisbury, North Carolina.  The segment of US 52 from Interstate 40 in Winston-Salem, North Carolina to Lexington is currently being upgraded to Interstate highway standards for the future Interstate 285 corridor. The segment from northern Winston-Salem to just south of Mount Airy is expected to form part of the Interstate 74 corridor through North Carolina.

South of the Triad area after splitting from Interstate 85 in Salisbury, US 52 is typically a two-lane route linking some of the state's smaller cities and towns. Albemarle is the largest municipality along this segment of US 52 to the South Carolina state line.

Between Salisbury and Albemarle in Northern Stanly county, US 52 bisects the campus of Pfeiffer University in Misenheimer.  Misenheimer may be the only municipality in America whose only traffic light is not at an intersection of two or more streets, but at a crosswalk to accommodate pedestrian traffic (the crosswalk being across US 52 connecting the two parts of Pfeiffer's campus on opposite sides of the highway).

Andy Griffith Parkway
The Andy Griffith Parkway is an 11-mile (18 km) section of U.S. Route 52 in northern Surry County, North Carolina, dedicated in honor of actor Andy Griffith. U.S. Route 52 through this stretch is a limited- controlled-access four-lane divided highway. Approximately  of the 11-mile (18 km) section passes through the corporate limits of Griffith's hometown of Mount Airy, North Carolina.

Background
Due to its proximity to Pilot Mountain State Park, in 1977 U.S. Route 52 through Surry County and Stokes County was dedicated as the Pilot Mountain Parkway by the North Carolina Department of Transportation.  However, in March 2002, the North Carolina Department of Transportation was approached by a grassroots group of residents of Mount Airy that felt that a highway dedication for Griffith was long overdue.

The group proposed to rename an 11-mile (18 km) section of the Pilot Mountain Parkway running from the Interstate 74 interchange north to the Virginia state line as the Andy Griffith Parkway. The Pilot Mountain Parkway designation would remain from the Interstate 74 intersection south through Stokes County.

The group had the support of the dedication from several North Carolina state agency officials that included Governor Mike Easley, State Treasurer Richard H. Moore and NCDOT Division 11 Board Member Sam Erby.  Each of these officials played an integral role in expediting the renaming through the North Carolina Department of Transportation's Road and Bridge Naming Committee. The dedication also had the full support of Andy Griffith. The NCDOT Road and Bridge Naming Committee voted unanimously for the dedication at their July 2002 meeting in Raleigh, North Carolina.

Dedication ceremony
A dedication ceremony was held on October 16, 2002, in the parking lot behind City Hall in Mount Airy. Andy Griffith accepted the invitation to attend the ceremony. It was Griffith’s first public appearance in his hometown in over 40 years. Also in attendance were Griffith’s wife Cindi Griffith, Governor Mike Easley, former University of North Carolina President William C. Friday, Grandfather Mountain developer Hugh Morton, as well as many more state and local officials. More than 3000 Andy Griffith fans also attended to welcome Griffith back to Mount Airy.

Dedicated and memorial names
US 52 features three additional dedicated stretches of highway.

 George S. Coble Memorial Highway – Official North Carolina name of US 52, from Old US 52 at the Davidson-Forsyth County line to US 29/70 south of Lexington.
 John Gold Memorial Expressway – Official North Carolina name of US 52 within the borders of Forsyth County.
 Pilot Mountain Parkway – Official North Carolina name of US 52, it originally went from King to the Virginia state line.  In 2002, it was shortened to the I-74 interchange south of Mount Airy, for the Andy Griffith Parkway.

History

US 52 was established in 1934 as a replacement of US 121/NC 66 from the Virginia state line, near Mount Airy, to Lexington and replacement of US 601/NC 80 from Lexington to the South Carolina state line, near McFarlan.

In the mid-1930s, US 52 was placed on current routing between Rocky River-Norwood and Misenheimer-Gold Hill.  In Wadesboro, US 52 was routed along Morgan-Washington-Martin Streets; while in Stokes County, US 52 was placed on new road between Pilot Mountain and King.

In 1941, US 52 was removed from Salisbury Road and placed on its current routing, with US 29/70, south of Lexington.  Between 1945-1949, US 52 was split in downtown Winston-Salem:  northbound using the original Main Street route, southbound using Liberty Street and First Street.  In 1949, US 52 was placed on a new bypass east of Pilot Mountain, leaving US 52A along the main street route.

In 1952, US 52 was placed onto new northern bypass of Lexington, its old route through became part of US 29A/70A and NC 8.  In 1953, US 52 was placed onto new western bypass of Mount Airy, its old route through became US 52A (today US 52 Business).  In either 1956 or 1957, US 52 was placed on its current route through Wadesboro, via US 74; also around same time period, US 52 was removed from Old Fancy Gap Road near the Virginia state line.

From 1960-1972, the next series of changes were in the Winston-Salem area; starting in 1960 with US 52 was removed from Main Street and onto Old Salem Road.  In 1962, US 52 northbound was changed to Main Street, Fifth Street, and Liberty Street.  By 1964, US 52 was placed onto new freeway from Winston-Salem, just south of East-West Expressway, to Pilot Mountain; this replaced the old route from Stanleyville to Pilot Mountain, becoming simply Old US 52.  By 1973, US 52 was completed moved onto the completed North-South Expressway in Forsyth County, completely removing US 52 from all regular roads through the county.

In 1971, US 52 was joined with I-85, from the Yadkin River to Salisbury, leaving the downtown area.  In 1980, the freeway from Forsyth County extended into Davidson County at Midway.  By 1982, New London was placed on a short bypass west of town.  Between 1985-1987, US 52 was given its current Albemarle bypass routing; in October, 2010, the routing was rebuilt along its southern portion.  Between 1991-1993, US 52 was extended further south onto new freeway from Midway to Welcome in north Davidson County; by 1995, the freeway connected with the Lexington bypass, completing US 52's move from rural road to freeway from Lexington to Mount Airy.

Throughout most of the 2010s, a series of road improvements were made along US 52 in Winston-Salem, including replacement of bridges, interchanges and widening of lanes and shoulders. The initial change was a replacement of the Liberty Street bridges (built in 1964) over Liberty Street and the Norfolk Southern Railroad Switching Yard.  The project included the permanent ramp closure of exit 111-B, on February 19, 2011; the entire project was completed on November 1, 2012.  In 2012, exit 110-A to Third, Fourth, Fifth Street was permanently closed related to the widening of US 52 and extending new acceleration lanes to the neighboring interchanges.  In 2013, construction began on the Salem Creek Connector (later becoming an extension of Research Parkway), at a cost of $68.9 million, it involved reconfiguring exit 108-B (replacing Vargrave Street with Research Parkway), the permanent closure of 108-C (Stadium Drive, later renamed Rams Drive), bridge replacements (including a truss flyover for Norfolk Southern) and the realignment of area roads.  On January 6, 2014, exit 108-B was closed and Vargrave Street razed.  On July 12, 2017, exit 108-B reopened to the public as Research Parkway, utilizing a diverging diamond interchange layout; exit 108-C to Rams Drive was then permanently closed, with a bridge replacement completed shortly after.

U.S. Route 121

U.S. Route 121 (US 121) was an original US highway, established in 1926, and was completely overlapped with NC 66.  Beginning north from Main Street (US 70/NC 10), in Lexington, it went through Welcome and Midway to Winston-Salem.  Traversing through Winston-Salem on Waughtown Road and Main Street, it exits north along Patterson Avenue to Stanleyville.  Continuing north through Rural Hall, King, and Pilot Mountain, it reached downtown Mount Airy, before continuing on north into Virginia, via Old Fancy Gap Road.  By 1929, US 121 was rerouted south of Winston-Salem along Spur Street; its old alignment remained part of NC 77.  In late 1934, both US 121 and NC 66 were replaced by US 52.

Future
In 2011 there were plans to widen US 52 between Wadesboro and NC 24/NC 27, in Albemarle, to four-lanes by around 2015 (STIP: R-2320).

In the more distant future, US 52 between NC 65, in Winston-Salem, and I-74, near Mount Airy, is planned to be reconstructed to interstate-grade standards as part of I-74 (STIP: I-4404).

Upgrades of US 52 to interstate grade, between I-85 and I-40/US 311 are estimated to cost $8.725 million.  Property acquisition was to start in June 2012, with construction scheduled for May 2013.  Once completed, US 52 will be in concurrency with Interstate 285.

Junction list

See also
 
 
 Special routes of U.S. Route 52
 High Rock Lake
 Pee Dee National Wildlife Refuge
 Pee Dee River
 Pilot Mountain State Park
 Rocky River
 Yadkin River

References

External links

 
 NCRoads.com: U.S. 52
 NCRoads.com: U.S. 121

52
 North Carolina
Transportation in Anson County, North Carolina
Transportation in Stanly County, North Carolina
Transportation in Cabarrus County, North Carolina
Transportation in Rowan County, North Carolina
Transportation in Davidson County, North Carolina
Transportation in Forsyth County, North Carolina
Transportation in Stokes County, North Carolina
Transportation in Surry County, North Carolina
Transportation in Winston-Salem, North Carolina